Proctor Piper State Forest covers  in Cavendish, Vermont in Windsor County. The forest is managed by the Vermont Department of Forests, Parks, and Recreation.

Activities in the forest include hunting and snowmobiling.

References

External links
Official website

Vermont state forests
Protected areas of Windsor County, Vermont
Cavendish, Vermont
Civilian Conservation Corps in Vermont